Lake Worth is a city in Tarrant County, Texas, United States. The population was 4,584 at the 2010 census. The city is adjacent to, and named after, Lake Worth, a popular recreational lake in the northwestern portion of Tarrant County.

Geography

Lake Worth is located at  (32.810916, –97.432577).

According to the United States Census Bureau, the city has a total area of 2.5 square miles (6.5 km2), all land.

Demographics

2020 census

As of the 2020 United States census, there were 4,711 people, 1,704 households, and 1,162 families residing in the city.

2000 census
As of the census of 2000, there were 4,618 people, 1,660 households, and 1,233 families living in the city. The population density was 1,831.2 people per square mile (707.5/km2). There were 1,751 housing units at an average density of 694.4/sq mi (268.3/km2). The racial makeup of the city was 88.20% White, 0.87% African American, 0.89% Native American, 0.95% Asian, 0.11% Pacific Islander, 6.17% from other races, and 2.82% from two or more races. Hispanic or Latino people of any race were 14.51% of the population.

There were 1,660 households, out of which 33.7% had children under the age of 18 living with them, 56.6% were married couples living together, 12.9% had a female householder with no husband present, and 25.7% were non-families. 21.1% of all households were made up of individuals, and 10.8% had someone living alone who was 65 years of age or older. The average household size was 2.70 and the average family size was 3.12.

In the city, the population was spread out, with 25.5% under the age of 18, 7.8% from 18 to 24, 28.5% from 25 to 44, 22.0% from 45 to 64, and 16.1% who were 65 years of age or older. The median age was 38 years. For every 100 females, there were 92.4 males. For every 100 females age 18 and over, there were 88.9 males.

The median income for a household in the city was $39,101, and the median income for a family was $41,703. Males had a median income of $31,192 versus $25,148 for females. The per capita income for the city was $17,522. About 7.7% of families and 9.4% of the population were below the poverty line, including 11.6% of those under age 18 and 13.2% of those age 65 or over.

Education

The city of Lake Worth is served by the Lake Worth Independent School District.

References

External links
 City of Lake Worth official website
 Northwest Tarrant Chamber of Commerce
 Lake Worth dredging FAQs

Dallas–Fort Worth metroplex
Cities in Texas
Cities in Tarrant County, Texas